Thomas Bywater Smithies (27 August 1817 – 20 July 1883) was an English radical publisher and campaigner for temperance and animal welfare. He was the founder and editor of the broadsheet periodical The British Workman.

Biography 
Smithies was born in York, to James and Catherine Smithies, the second of ten children. His mother was a campaigner for abolitionism, animal welfare and temperance. He was converted to Methodism at age 15, joining the Methodist Society. The following year, he started work at the Yorkshire Fire and Life Insurance Company, where he worked for 18 years, while also working as a Sunday school teacher. He became teetotal in 1837, aged 20.

In 1849, Smithies moved to London to become the manager of the Gutta Percha Company. The first "Band of Hope" in London was formed at Hannah Bevan's house and it included some of her neighbours and children. In 1851, he published Sunday Scholars' Friend and the  Band of Hope Review (1851–1937). This was followed by The British Workman in 1855; edited by Smithies. Subsequent publications included The Infant's Magazine, The Children's Friend, The Family Friend, The Friendly Visitor, and The Weekly Welcome.

In 1879, he published the Band of Mercy Advocate (1879–1934), a periodical for the Bands of Mercy movement, which was founded by his mother.

On 20 July 1883, after a period of long illness, Smithies died of heart disease, aged 67. He was buried with his mother in Abney Park Cemetery.

References

Further reading 

 T. B. Smithies: Editor of "The British workman": A Memoir (1884) by George Stringer Rowe

1817 births
1883 deaths
19th-century English businesspeople
British animal welfare scholars
British animal welfare workers
Burials at Abney Park Cemetery
English magazine editors
English Methodists
English pamphleteers
English philanthropists
English publishers (people)
English reformers
English temperance activists
People from York